The 1996 Qatari coup d'état attempt was an attempted coup in Qatar against Emir Hamad bin Khalifa Al Thani that was foiled on the night of February 14, 1996, less than one year into Hamad bin Khalifa's reign. Qatari intelligence termed the coup attempt as "Operation Abu Ali".

New details regarding the coup were described in 2018 by an Al Jazeera documentary after the Qatar diplomatic crisis; accusing Bahrain, Egypt, Saudi Arabia, and United Arab Emirates of plotting to overthrow Hamad bin Khalifa Al Thani.

Motivations
Then Crown Prince Hamad bin Khalifa Al Thani carried out a successful coup against his father Khalifa bin Hamad Al Thani on June 27, 1995, thereby formally becoming Emir of Qatar. The coup, enacted while sheikh Khalifa was on a visit to Switzerland, was bloodless. In response to the transfer of power, sheikh Khalifa called his son an "ignorant man" and proclaimed that he was still the legitimate ruler. Sheikh Khalifa was later offered refuge in the United Arab Emirates.

The first year of Emir Hamad's reign saw important measures taken to promote freedom of the press as well as steps towards a democratically elected parliament. This was in sharp contrast to his father, whose policies and values were more traditional and culturally conservative.

Coup d'état

Plot
Many high-ranking members of the Al Thani family who were still allies of the deposed emir organized a counter-coup to overthrow Emir Hamad. Qatar has claimed that the coup had foreign backing, mainly by the United Arab Emirates, Saudi Arabia, Egypt and Bahrain. A 1997 New York Times article stated that some unnamed western diplomats believed that the coup could have only been planned with knowledge and acquiescence from Saudi Arabia and United Arab Emirates. 

In 2018 and after the 2017 Qatar diplomatic crisis, Al Jazeera reported apparent new details in a documentary regarding the operation accusing Saudi Arabia, Bahrain, Egypt, and the United Arab Emirates (UAE) of plotting to overthrow Hamad bin Khalifa Al Thani. According to the documentary, the crux of the operation would see armed men place Emir Hamad under house arrest at his residence off of Al Rayyan Road. This was originally planned to occur at 5 AM on February 16, but was changed to February 14 to reduce the chance of being discovered. According to Qatari intelligence, this change was at the behest of Mohammed bin Zayed Al Nahyan, which was then chief of the Emirati armed forces. Furthermore, Qatari intelligence documents claimed that, after having assuming full command of Qatar's military facilities, the plotters would send for assistance to militias in Saudi Arabia. However, the coup was ultimately discovered and foiled before it could be carried out.

According to Al Jazeera, a former French army commander Paul Barril was contracted and supplied with weapons by the UAE to carry out the coup operation in Qatar. UAE minister of foreign affairs Anwar Gargash responded to the documentary and stated that Paul Barril was in fact a security agent of the Qatari Sheikh Khalifa bin Hamad Al Thani who visited Abu Dhabi and had no relationship with the UAE and the documentary was a falsification attempt to inculpate the UAE in the coup.

Trial
The emir's cousin, former Minister of Economy and head police chief Hamad bin Jassim bin Hamad Al Thani, was named as the prime architect of the coup. After years of exile, he was finally kidnapped in July 1999 and brought to trial. In February 2000, Hamad bin Jassim, as well as 32 other plotters, were handed life sentences for planning out the coup. There were an additional 85 defendants who were convicted on charges relating to the coup; some were tried in absentia. All of the defendants in attendance pleaded not guilty.

Aftermath
In an investigation conducted by the Qatari media organization Al Jazeera, Fahad Al-Malki, a key member of the coup attempt, was interviewed. He claimed that Hamad bin Isa Al Khalifa, then Bahraini crown-prince, transferred $265,000 to him in order to carry out post-coup attempt bombings throughout Qatar under the guise of an opposition group to Amir Hamad bin Khalifa Al Thani named "The Restoration of Legitimacy". In October 1996, Al-Malki ordered a bomb to be planted at the office of the Immigration Department, but his attempts were thwarted as the bomb did not detonate as expected. Later, he fled to the UAE to avoid trial.

See also 
 1995 Qatari coup d'état

References

Conflicts in 1996
Coup d'etat, 1996
coup d'etat attempt
Qatar
Military history of Qatar
Military coups in Qatar
Qatari coup d'état attempt